The "Henry Fite House", located on West Baltimore Street (then known as Market Street), between South Sharp and North Liberty Streets (also later known as Hopkins Place), in Baltimore, Maryland, was the meeting site of the Second Continental Congress from December 20, 1776, until February 22, 1777.  

Built as an inn and tavern around 1770 in the Georgian architectural style in red brick with white wood trim by Henry Fite (1722–1789), the building became known as "Congress Hall" when it briefly served as the new nation's seat of government in 1776–77. Later, following the Revolutionary War, it became known locally as "Old Congress Hall". The structure was destroyed during the Great Baltimore Fire of February 7–8, 1904, which started nearby.

Nation's capital

The Second Continental Congress moved from Philadelphia to Baltimore in the winter of 1776 to avoid capture by British forces, who were advancing on Philadelphia, the new American capital city, during the New York and New Jersey campaign. As the largest building then in forty-seven-year-old Baltimore Town, Henry Fite's six year old tavern provided a comfortable location of sufficient size for the Congress to meet; its site at the western edge of town was beyond easy reach of the British Royal Navy's ships and artillery should they try to sail up the Harbor and the Patapsco River to shell the town. A visitor described the tavern as a "three-story and attic brick house, of about 92 feet front on Market Street, by about 50 or 55 feet depth on the side streets, with cellar under the whole; having 14 rooms, exclusive of kitchen, wash-house and other out-buildings, including a stable for 30 horses."

Thus, Baltimore became the nation's capital for a two-month period. While meeting here in Maryland on December 27, 1776, the Continental Congress conferred upon General George Washington, (1732–1799), "extraordinary powers for the conduct of the Revolutionary War,"  a stirring vote of confidence, now a year and-a-half after having commissioned him as head of the newly organized  Continental Army, following a series of defeats and retreats since the Virginian assumed command in June 1775, when the Army recruited from local militia surrounded the British in a siege at Boston after the  opening  skirmishes in April at Lexington and Concord in Massachusetts followed by the June British attack at Breed's and Bunker Hills across the Charles River from Boston.

In her 1907 biography of the Fite family, descendant Elizabeth Fite corrected earlier historians who mistakenly reported Jacob Fite as the owner of the house. She explained that while Henry's son, Jacob, lived in the house, he was a child when the building was occupied by Congress and never actually owned the building. After Henry died on October 25, 1789, his estate was distributed among his seven surviving children; the "Henry Fite House" became the property of his eldest daughter, Elizabeth, and her husband, George Reinicker.

George Peabody

Philanthropist and international financier George Peabody (1795–1869), of South Danvers (later Peabody), Massachusetts, and New York City, moved to Baltimore in 1816. The "Henry Fite House" served as his home and office during the next 20 years in the 1820s and 30s, where he directed his growing wide-ranging business, financial and investment empire, which by mid-century had made him the richest man in America. He later endowed the Peabody Institute in 1857, which opened nine years later with the adjoining Library in 1878. Along with the additional educational, cultural and civic programs in the mid-1860s, the Institute and Conservatory were to be built across from the Washington Monument on the Circle at North Charles and East Monument Streets (also known as Washington Place and Mount Vernon Place) in the northern city neighborhood of Mount Vernon-Belvedere formerly known as "Howard's Woods" on the "Belvidere" estate and mansion of Revolutionary War commander of the Maryland Line in the Continental Army, Col. John Eager Howard (1752-1827) who donated the land. Later during the decades following his 1827 death, his sons and family cut up and divided the estate building large elaborate substantial townhouses on a grid of streets including Peabody's Institute added north of original colonial era in Baltimore Town.

Peabody left Baltimore for New York City and later London in 1837, as more and more of his international financial and business affairs consumed his time. His most famous return to the city was in 1866 (three years before his death) to address the large crowd of Baltimoreans including Baltimore City Public School children gathered on the front steps of his new Institute when it was finally dedicated in an elaborate ceremony after a long interval, interrupted by the Civil War.

Royal Farms Arena
The former location of the "Henry Fite House" is currently occupied by the Royal Farms Arena, originally known as the Baltimore Civic Center and from 2003-2013 1st Mariner Arena. Built in 1961–62 in the western downtown area, with a civic auditorium, arena, convention hall and exhibition galleries, the building became a center of Baltimore's sports and entertainment life. It covers the city block bounded by West Baltimore Street (north), Hopkins Place (east), Howard Street (west) and West Lombard Street (south).

Memorial tablet
The Maryland Society of the Sons of the American Revolution placed a large, elaborate, polished bronze memorial tablet in front of the "Henry Fite House" on February 22, 1894, describing the building's brief service to the nation. An inscription on the tablet proclaimed to visitors: "On this site stood Old Congress Hall, in which the Continental Congress met". Ten years later, only the memorial tablet remained on the corner of the smoking ruins after the Great Fire on February 7–8, 1904, which devastated most of downtown Baltimore and the waterfront.

When the Civic Center (now the Royal Farms Arena) was built on the site, the bronze tablet of 1894 was preserved and mounted on the outside wall facing Hopkins Place, near the northeast corner of the building. During a later remodel, the plaque was moved inside the new glass-enclosed lobby.

See also
 Former national capitals
 Maryland in the American Revolution
 Timeline of Baltimore history
 History of Baltimore
 History of Maryland

References 

Houses completed in 1770
Continental Congress
Demolished buildings and structures in Baltimore
History of Baltimore
Houses in Baltimore
Former national capitol buildings in the United States
Burned houses in the United States
1770 establishments in Maryland